The Nanjing dialect, also known as Nankinese, or Nanjing Mandarin, is a dialect of Mandarin Chinese spoken in Nanjing, China.  It is part of the Jianghuai group of Chinese varieties.

Phonology
A number of features distinguish the Nanjing dialect from other Mandarin varieties. It maintains the glottal stop final and the entering tone, which Northern Mandarin or Southwestern Mandarin likely also had until recently. Like Northern Mandarin, it has preserved the retroflex initials of Middle Chinese. As with other Jianghuai Mandarin dialects, the Nanjing dialect has lost syllable-initial , which have all become . Northern Mandarin, on the other hand, retains distinct  and  initials.

While Mandarin dialects typically feature two nasal finals ( and ), these have merged into one in Jianghuai Mandarin dialects.

Expansion
The earliest dialect of Nanjing was an ancient Wu dialect during the Eastern Jin. After the Wu Hu uprising, the Jin Emperor and many northern Chinese fled south, establishing the new capital Jiankang in what is modern day Nanjing.  It was during this time that the ancient Wu of Nanjing was replaced by Jianghuai Mandarin. Further events occurred, such as Hou Jing's rebellions during the Liang dynasty, the Sui dynasty invasion of the Chen dynasty which resulted in Jiankang's destruction, Ming Taizu's relocation of southerners from below the Yangtze to his newly established capital Nanjing, and the establishment of Nanjing as the capital of the Taiping Kingdom during the Taiping rebellion which resulted in a significant decrease in the city's population.  These events all played a role in forming the Nanjing dialect of today.

Prominence
Some linguists have studied the influence that Nanjing Jianghuai Mandarin had on the Mandarin-based koiné spoken by the Ming dynasty. Although it was based on the Nanjing dialect, there were important differences and the koiné exhibited non-Jianghuai characteristics. Francisco Varo, a Dominican friar living in 17th century China pointed to Nanjing as one of several places Mandarin speech paralleled that of the elites.

During the 19th century, dispute arose over whether the Nanjing dialect or Beijing dialect should be preferred by Western diplomats and translators, as the prestige of the Nanjing dialect seemed to be waning. Even when it was clear that the Beijing dialect had gained prominence, many sinologists and missionaries maintained their preference for the Nanjing dialect. Leipzig-based professor Georg von der Gabelentz even argued that the Nanjing dialect was preferable for scientific texts because it had fewer homophones:

The originally Japanese book Mandarin Compass was modified with Nanjing dialect's tones and published with French commentary by Jiangnan-based French missionary Henri Boucher.  Calvin W. Mateer attempted to compromise between Northern and Southern Mandarin in his book A Course of Mandarin Lessons, published in 1892.

Study of the Nanjing dialect
Important works written about the Nanjing dialect include Syllabar des Nankingdialektes oder der correkten Aussprache sammt Vocabular by Franz Kühnert, and Die Nanking Kuanhua by K. Hemeling.

The English & Chinese vocabulary in the court dialect by Samuel Wells Williams was based on the Nanjing dialect, rather than the Beijing dialect.  Williams also described the differences between Nanjing and Beijing Mandarin in the same book and noted the ways in which the Peking dialect differs from the Nanjing dialect, such as the palatalization of velars before front vowels.  Williams also noted that the changes were consistent so that switching between pronunciations would not be difficult.

Romanization
In the 19th and early 20th centuries, romanization of Mandarin consisted of both Beijing and Nanjing pronunciations. The Chinese Recorder and Missionary Journal offered that romanizing for both Nanjing and Beijing dialects was beneficial. The journal explained that, for example, because 希 and 西 are pronounced the same in Beijing but differently in Nanjing (with the latter being si), the Standard System retains the two spellings.  The system similarly retains contrasts in Beijing that are missing in Nanjing, such as that between 官 and 光.

References

Citations

Bibliography

Further reading

 (radical index)
 

Nanjing
Mandarin Chinese
City colloquials
Dialects by location